The Wausaukee River is a river that flows through Marinette County, Wisconsin. The source of the river is in the Town of Athelstane. The river then flows through the Town of Athelstane and into the Town of Wausaukee. The Wausaukee River continues through the village of Wausaukee before flowing into the Menominee River.

See also
 List of rivers of Wisconsin

References

Rivers of Wisconsin
Rivers of Marinette County, Wisconsin